Sara Hammond (1672 – May 1716) was a Norwegian landowner and businesswoman. She was born in Trondheim, a daughter of merchant Thomas Hammond. She was married to civil servant, landowner and mine owner Albert Angell, and was the mother of Thomas Angell. After the death of her first husband in 1705, she took over the administration of the family business, which included ownership of 29 out of 172 shares of the Røros Copper Works, forests, sawmills, and land properties in Selbu, Strinda and Høylandet. In 1709 she married merchant and city manager Søren Bygball.

References

1672 births
1716 deaths
People from Trondheim
17th-century Norwegian businesswomen
17th-century Norwegian businesspeople
Norwegian landowners
Norwegian businesspeople in mining
Norwegian people of English descent
18th-century Norwegian businesswomen
18th-century Norwegian businesspeople
18th-century women landowners